Pinus squamata, the Qiaojia pine (zh: 巧家五针松) or southern lacebark pine, is a critically endangered pine native to a single locality consisting of about 20 trees in Qiaojia County, northeast Yunnan, China, at about  elevation.

The Qiaojia pine was discovered in April 1991 by Pangzhao J.Q. It was studied later that year and described the following year by Li Xiang-Wang. It shows similarities to Rzedowski's Pinyon and some other pinyon pines.

Description
Its habitat is open secondary woodland, scrub, and grassland mixed with Yunnan pine.

The Qiaojia pine has a conic crown with flaky pale gray-green bark becoming dark brown with age, similar to the closely related lacebark pine. The shoots are reddish to greenish brown and may be pubescent or glabrous.

Conservation
Pinus squamata is the rarest of world pine species, with the endangered Torrey pine, Pinus torreyana, being the next most rare pine species.  This species has an extremely restricted range, known from only a very small area which is essentially one location. It seems to be a naturally very rare taxon and there is no indication for there having been any past reduction and likewise no evidence for any continuing decline. Hence the species is listed as Critically Endangered under criterion D on the basis of the very small population – around 18-20 mature individuals.

References

External links
Flora of China
Photo of cones

Squamata
Endemic flora of China
Trees of China
Critically endangered flora of Asia
Edible nuts and seeds